The 2020 Nobel Memorial Prize in Economic Sciences was awarded jointly to the American economists Paul Milgrom (b. 1948) and Robert B. Wilson (b. 1937) "for improvements to auction theory and inventions of new auction formats." According to the Nobel Committee, the recognition was given because "their theoretical discoveries have improved auctions in practice." Furthermore, Secretary Hansson said: 

Their joint key contributions to economics were the development of the simultaneous multiple round auctions (SMRA) and the reputation effects (game theory). Milgrom's personal contributions were on the no-trade theorem, market design, supermodular games, monotone comparative statics, Linkage principle, and deferred-acceptance auction, whereas Wilson's contributions were on the common value auction and the Wilson doctrine.

Laureates

Paul Milgrom

Paul Milgrom was born in Detroit, Michigan, April 20, 1948, the second of four sons to Jewish parents. Milgrom graduated from the University of Michigan in 1970 with an AB in mathematics. He worked as an actuary for several years in San Francisco at the Metropolitan Insurance Company and then at the Nelson and Warren consultancy in Columbus, Ohio. Milgrom became a Fellow of the Society of Actuaries in 1974. In 1975, Milgrom enrolled for graduate studies at Stanford University and earned an MS in statistics in 1978 and a PhD in business in 1979. He was the recipient of the 2008 Erwin Plein Nemmers Prize in Economics "for contributions dramatically expanding the understanding of the role of information and incentives in a variety of settings, including auctions, the theory of the firm, and oligopolistic markets"; the 2012 BBVA Foundation Frontiers of Knowledge Award "for his seminal contributions to an unusually wide range of fields of economics including auctions, market design, contracts and incentives, industrial economics, economics of organizations, finance, and game theory"; the 2014 Golden Goose Award; and the 2018 John J. Carty Award for the Advancement of Science with Robert B Wilson and David M. Kreps.

Robert B. Wilson

Wilson was born on May 16, 1937, in Geneva, Nebraska. He graduated from Lincoln High School in Lincoln, Nebraska and earned a full scholarship to Harvard University. He received his A.B. from Harvard College in 1959. He then completed his M.B.A. in 1961 and his D.B.A. in 1963 from the Harvard Business School. He worked at the University of California, Los Angeles for a very brief time and then joined the faculty at Stanford University. He has been on the faculty of the Stanford Business School since 1964. He was also an affiliated faculty member of Harvard Law School from 1993 to 2001. He was the recipient of the 2014 Golden Goose Award for his work involving auction design; the 2015 BBVA Foundation Frontiers of Knowledge Award "for his "pioneering contributions to the analysis of strategic interactions when economic agents have limited and different information about their environment"; and the 2018 John J. Carty Award for the Advancement of Science with David M. Kreps and Paul Milgrom.

References

2020
2020 awards